The Bight of Biafra (known as the Bight of Bonny in Nigeria) is a bight off the west-central African coast, in the easternmost part of the Gulf of Guinea.

Geography
The Bight of Biafra, or Mafra (named after the town Mafra in southern Portugal), between Capes Formosa and Lopez, is the most eastern part of the Gulf of Guinea; it contains the islands Bioko [Equatorial Guinea], São Tomé and Príncipe. The name Biafra – as indicating the country – fell into disuse in the later part of the 19th century 

A 1710 map indicates that the region known as "Biafra" (Biafra) was located in present-day Cameroon.

The Bight of Biafra extends east from the River Delta of the Niger in the north until it reaches Cape Lopez in Gabon. Besides the Niger River, other rivers reaching the bay are the Cross River, Calabar River, Ndian, Wouri, Sanaga, Nyong River, Ntem, Mbia, Mbini, Muni and Komo River.

The main islands in the Bay are Bioko and Príncipe; other important islands are Ilhéu Bom Bom, Ilhéu Caroço, Elobey Grande and Elobey Chico. Countries located at the Bight of Biafra are Cameroon, the eastern region of Nigeria, Equatorial Guinea (Bioko Island and Rio Muni), and Gabon

History

The Bight of Biafra accounted for an estimated 10.7% of all enslaved people that were transported to the Americas between 1519-1700. Between 1701-1800, it accounted for an estimated 14.97%. Those stolen from the Bight of Biafra include the Bamileke, Igbo, Tikar, Bakossi, Fang, Massa, Bubi and many more. These captured Africans arrived in what would become the United States and were sold in Virginia, which held 60% of all slaves on the eastern coast. Virginia and surrounding colonies held 30,000 slaves. Normally, enslaved people were cheaper when bought in Cameroon because they preferred to die rather than accept slavery.

By the middle of the eighteenth century, Bonny had emerged as the major slave trading port on the Bight of Biafra outpacing the earlier dominant slave ports at Elem Kalabari (also known then as New Calabar) and Old Calabar. These 3 ports together accounted for over 90% of the slave trade emanating from the Bight of Biafra.

Between 1525 and 1859, Britain accounted for over two-thirds of slaves exported from the Bight of Biafra to the New World.

In 1777, Portugal transferred control of Fernando Po and Annobón to Spanish suzerainty thus introducing Spain into the early colonial history of the Bight of Biafra.

In 1807, the United Kingdom made illegal the international trade in slaves, and the Royal Navy was deployed to forcibly prevent slavers from the United States, France, Spain, Portugal, Holland, West Africa and Arabia from plying their trade.

On 30 June 1849, Britain established its military influence over the Bight of Biafra by building a naval base and consulate on the island of Fernando Po, under the authority of the British Consuls of the Bight of Benin:
 May 1852—1853           Louis Fraser
 1853—April 1859          Benjamin Campbell
 April 1859—1860          George Brand
 1860—January 1861        Henry Hand
 January—May 1861    Henry Grant Foote
 May—6 August 1861   William McCoskry (acting)

On 6 August 1861, the Bight of Biafra and the neighboring Bight of Benin (under its own British consuls) became a united British consulate, again under British consuls:
 1861—December 1864       Richard Francis Burton
 December 1864—1873       Charles Livingstone
 1873—1878                George Hartley
 1878—13 September 1879   David Hopkins
 13 September 1879—5 June 1885  Edward Hyde Hewett.

In 1967, the Eastern Region of Nigeria seceded from the Nigerian State and adopted the name of its coastline, the adjoining Bight of Biafra, becoming the newly independent Republic of Biafra. This independence was short-lived as the new state lost the ensuing Nigerian Civil War. In 1975, by decree, the Nigerian government changed the name of the Bight of Biafra to the Bight of Bonny.

Slave traders
 Daniel Backhouse
 George Case
 William Boats
 William Davenport
 John Shaw
 Samuel Shaw

Pulsations

In 1962, Jack Oliver, a geologist at Columbia University, first noticed the earth had a "pulse" also known in geology lingo as a "microseism". This discovery was put on the shelves and re-examined briefly in 1980 by Gary Holcomb and then fully examined in 2005 by graduate student Greg Benson at the University of Colorado.

Later results revealed that the earth pulses every 26 seconds, but nobody is exactly sure why. Theories range from waves hitting the continental shelf to volcanic activity.

By using triangulation, they were able to locate the source of the pulse in the Bight of Bonny.

References

External links
 Worldstatesmen

Bays of the Atlantic Ocean
Gulf of Guinea
Biafra
Regions of Africa
Bodies of water of Cameroon
Bodies of water of Equatorial Guinea
Bodies of water of Gabon
Bodies of water of Nigeria
Cameroon–Equatorial Guinea border
Cameroon–Nigeria border
Equatorial Guinea–Gabon border
Equatorial Guinea–São Tomé and Príncipe border
Gabon–São Tomé and Príncipe border
Nigeria–São Tomé and Príncipe border
Equatorial Guinea–Nigeria border
Bights (geography)